Zhang Qingli (born 10 February 1951 in Dongping County, Shandong) is a politician of the People's Republic of China. He served as the first-ranked Vice-Chairman of the 13th National Committee of the Chinese People's Political Consultative Conference (CPPCC). He was the Vice-Chairman and Secretary-General of the 12th National Committee of the CPPCC. Previously he was the Communist Party Chief of Tibet Autonomous Region from 2006 to 2011 and of Hebei Province from 2011 to 2013. He was a member of the 16th, 17th, and 18th Central Committees of the Chinese Communist Party.

References 

1951 births
Living people
Politicians from Tai'an
Chinese Communist Party politicians from Shandong
People's Republic of China politicians from Shandong
Secretary-General of the Chinese People's Political Consultative Conference
Vice Chairpersons of the National Committee of the Chinese People's Political Consultative Conference
Members of the 18th Central Committee of the Chinese Communist Party